The 19th Central American and Caribbean Games were held in San Salvador, El Salvador from November 22 to December 8, 2002 and included 4,301 competitors from 31 nations, competing in 32 sports. The main stadium for these championships was the Estadio Nacional Flor Blanca.For political reasons,Cuba decided to boycott the event. Squash made its debut at the Central American and Caribbean Games.

Sports

  Beach Volleyball

  Racquetball

  Roller skating

Medal table

References

 Official site (archived)
 Meta
 Official Results

 
2002 in multi-sport events
International sports competitions hosted by El Salvador
2002 in Salvadoran sport
2002 in Central American sport
2002 in Caribbean sport
Multi-sport events in El Salvador
21st century in San Salvador
Sports competitions in San Salvador
November 2002 sports events in North America
2002
December 2002 sports events in North America